Kokou Dodji Fanny (born 17 April 1987 in Lomé) is a Togolese table tennis player. He represented Togo at the 2020 Summer Olympics and was one of the Togolese flag bearers at the Parade of Nations.

Career

Fanny lost four sets to nil to Andrej Gacina in the first round of the men's singles table tennis at the 2020 Summer Olympics.

References

External links
 Profile on olympics.org 

1987 births
Living people
Togolese table tennis players
Olympic table tennis players of Togo
Table tennis players at the 2020 Summer Olympics
Sportspeople from Lomé
African Games competitors for Togo
Competitors at the 2019 African Games
21st-century Togolese people